Cutting Jade is a five-piece rock group from Pretoria, South Africa, formed in 1998.

History
Their first demo single was released to South Africa's largest campus station TUKS FM (then still Radio TUKS) in late 1998 and reached number one on the station's South African Top 10. The same song also made it to number 10 on the station's Top 30, the first unsigned band ever to feature at all on that chart. Their second demo gained a similar response and the band became popular at live shows in Pretoria.

So There We Were, was Cutting Jade's first album, released in 2000. The band described this independent release "as an emotional rock album with relevant and accessible lyrics. Our intention has never been to baffle audiences with erudite lyrics or impress them with technical complexity any more than it has been to be part of any musical fashion or trend."

Cutting Jade then signed to the David Gresham Record Company late in 2001 and brought out a second album: Between Two Lives. Ten Seconds, the first single off the album, reached number 1 in the national Top 40. Look at me now, the second single off the album was also successful. A fan described Between Two Lives as "an album packed with raw emotion, driving guitars and passionate vocal deliveries".

In April 2002 the band travelled to France where they played at Course Croisière de l'Edhec, one of the most important sailing competition in France.

In July 2002 Cutting Jade played a four-date tour in the United Kingdom with Wonderboom, another band on the David Gresham label. The tour comprised one night in Wales, one at the Shepherd's Bush Empire (on 26 July 2002) and two at other London venues.

Early in 2004 the band's future seemed bleak when they left David Gresham Records and vocalist Andrew Duggan left to pursue a solo career. The band recruited Logan Grobbelaar, a twenty-year-old marketing student at the University of Pretoria, as a vocalist and began recording a third studio album: Come Back to Life.

Trivia
 Logan was in a garage band while at varsity called "Till That Time". He left that band during that time to join Cutting Jade.
 Logan left The band in April 2007. His last gig as a part of Cutting Jade was Friday 13 April 2007 at Vaughn's Pool Bar in Edenvale (Johannesburg).
 Marliese left the band in April 2007 for a business opportunity in Cape St Francis. Her last gig as a part of Cutting Jade was 25 April 2007 at  Café Barcelona in Pretoria with Lonehill Estate.
 Andrew Duggan (then with the band Southworld ) temporarily returned to the band and filled in as lead singer for 4 gigs. Andrew and the remaining members realised that there was something special about the last four gigs and with the past behind them Andrew rejoined the band and introduced them to Nathan Lowe who stepped in as the new bass player.
 Andrew Duggan was in a band called Final Clearance before he joined Cutting Jade in 1998. Final Clearance never released an album.
 Jorn Dannheimer spent a few months playing for South African band 'Hang the Jury' after his split from Cutting Jade in 2005, but rejoined Cutting Jade in 2012 again. 'Hang the Jury' have now gone their own way and are recording their first demo.
 In early 2008 Andrew Duggan split with Southworld. Andrew rejoined Cutting Jade and the band set about finding a bass player to replace Marliese. The spot ended up being filled by Nathan Lowe. Nathan sang the high harmonies on the single "Supermodel" the preview single for the new album. Nathan also played piano on some of the tracks of the album and wrote the track entitled 'Scream'.
 Cutting Jade set about recording their fourth studio album "From Nothing" which has been hailed by critics and fans as their most complete all round album.

Members
Shaun Collins (guitar and lyrics) (1998 - )
Raoul Dippenaar (lead guitar) (1998 - )
Marliese Botha (bass) (1998 - 25 April 2007)
Logan Grobbelaar (vocals) (28 March 2004 - 13 April 2007)
Gavin Vaughan (Drums) (November 2004 - 2007 )
Rudolph van Wyk (Drums) (2007 - June 2009)
Eben Groenewald (Drums) (July 2009 - Before August 2012)
Andrew Duggan (vocals) (1998 - January 2004; 2008 - )
Jörn Dannheimer (drums) (1998 - October 2004; 2012 - )
Nathan Lowe (Bass) (2008 - )

Discography
1998: Two demo tracks
2000: So There We Were
2002: Between Two Lives
2002: Ten Seconds (single)
2002: Look at Me Now (single)
2004: Come Back to Life
2004: Almost Real (single)
2005: Angel K (single)
2006: People Are People (Depeche Mode Cover) (unreleased promo single)
2006: Easier For You (single)
2008: From Nothing
2010: Go your own way (Fleetwood Mac Cover)

External links
Cutting Jade Official Website: http://www.cuttingjade.com/
Cutting Jade Official Myspace Page: http://www.myspace.com/cuttingjade

South African rock music groups
Musical groups established in 1998